The Christopher C. Gibbs College of Architecture at the University of Oklahoma is the architecture unit of the University of Oklahoma in Norman. In 2010, it had an enrollment of 430 undergraduates and 101 graduates.

The college as it stands now was formed in 1970 as the College of Environmental Design. It was renamed the College of Architecture in 1984. Architecture was formally established at OU in 1926 under the College of Engineering. In 1947, renowned architect Bruce Goff was appointed chairman of the School of Architecture. Currently, Hans E. Butzer serves as Dean.

In Norman, classes are held primarily in the recently renovated Gould Hall.

Academic programs 
The college grants degrees at the Bachelor's, Master's  levels. Architectural fields covered at the college include:
Architecture
Construction Science
Interior Design
Landscape Architecture
Regional and City Planning

External links 
OU College of Architecture

References 

Architecture, College of
Architecture schools in Oklahoma
Educational institutions established in 1970